Liberia competed at the 1984 Summer Olympics in Los Angeles, United States.

Results by event

Athletics
Men's 200 metres 
 Augustus Moulton
 Heat — 22.94 (→ did not advance)

Men's 400 metres 
 Samuel Sarkpa
 Heat — 47.65 (→ did not advance)

Men's 5,000 metres 
 Nimley Twegbe
 Heat — 17:36.69 (→ did not advance)

Men's Marathon
 Nimley Twegbe — did not finish (→ no ranking)

Women's 100 metres
 Grace Ann Dinkins
 First Heat — 12.35s (→ did not advance)

References
Official Olympic Reports

Nations at the 1984 Summer Olympics
1984
OLy